Ridgewood Pearl (1992–2003) was an Irish-based Thoroughbred racehorse who in 1995 won four Group/Grade 1 races in four countries including over male horses in the Breeders' Cup Mile at Belmont Park in Elmont, New York.

The filly was bred by Sean Couglan and raced by his wife, Anne.

Ridgewood Pearl was retired to broodmare duty and produced five foals before dying in 2003 as a result of hemorrhaging after producing a dead foal.

References
 Ridgewood Pearl's pedigree and partial racing stats
 Official website for the 1995 Breeders' Cup Mile with details and race video
  May 12, 2003 Thoroughbred Times.com article titled Breeders' Cup Mile winner Ridgewood Pearl dies at 11

1992 racehorse births
2003 racehorse deaths
Racehorses bred in the United Kingdom
Racehorses trained in Ireland
Breeders' Cup Mile winners
Irish Classic Race winners
Byerley Turk sire line
Thoroughbred family 14-a